Basti Fauja is a town and union council of Dera Ghazi Khan District in the Punjab province of Pakistan. It is located at 29°46'49N 70°36'4E and has an altitude of 111 metres (367 feet).

References

Populated places in Dera Ghazi Khan District
Union councils of Dera Ghazi Khan District